iHeartRadio Wango Tango or commonly referred to as simply Wango Tango is an annual day-long concert produced by local Los Angeles radio station KIIS-FM. The concert series has been staged at various venues around southern California including Dodger Stadium in Los Angeles, the Rose Bowl in Pasadena, Angel Stadium in Anaheim, Verizon Wireless Amphitheatre in Irvine, Staples Center in Los Angeles and at the StubHub Center (formerly Home Depot Center) in Carson, CA.

The concert series is noted for featuring several marquee performers in a day long series of sets. Often, noted celebrities are on hand to introduce each act. The concert concept was conceived by then marketing director Von Freeman and the General Manager of KIIS FM at the time, Roy Laughlin.

Bands listed in alphabetical order (or, if known, in reverse order of night's performance).

1998 lineup
The 1998 event was held at Edison International Field of Anaheim on June 13.

Spice Girls
Mariah Carey
Will Smith
Hootie & The Blowfish
Meredith Brooks
Gloria Estefan
Paula Cole
Olivia Newton-John
*NSYNC
Vonda Shepard
Amber
All Saints
Wyclef Jean
Tom Jones

1999 lineup
The 1999 event was held at Dodger Stadium on June 12.

Ricky Martin
Britney Spears
Will Smith
98 Degrees
Blondie
UB40
Shaggy
Nancy Sinatra
Enrique Iglesias
Fabrice Morvan
Dianne Orellana
MC Hammer

2000 lineup
The 2000 event was held at Dodger Stadium on May 13.

*NSYNC
Bosson
Eiffel 65
Hanson
Marc Anthony
Jessica Simpson (with Nick Lachey)
Brian McKnight
Sugar Ray
Goo Goo Dolls
Lenny Kravitz
Enrique Iglesias
Sisqo

2001 lineup
The 2001 2-day event was held at Dodger Stadium on June 16–17.

3LW
Backstreet Boys
Blue Man Group
Britney Spears
American Hi-Fi
Dream
Eden's Crush
Nelly Furtado
Jessica Simpson
Nikka Costa
Shaggy
Sean "Puffy" Combs
Ricky Martin
Samantha Mumba
Wayne Newton
Aerosmith
The Bee Gees
Vertical Horizon
Pink/Mýa/Lil' Kim/Christina Aguilera (singing "Lady Marmalade")

2002 lineup
The 2002 event was held at the Rose Bowl on June 15.

Vanessa Carlton
Michelle Branch
O-Town
Craig David
India.Arie
Marc Anthony
Paulina Rubio
Nick Carter (with Aaron Carter)
Kelly Osbourne (with Pure Rubbish)
Pink (with Steven Tyler)
Alanis Morissette
No Doubt
Celine Dion
Will Smith
Ja Rule (with Ashanti)
Mary J. Blige

2003 lineup
The 2003 event was held at the Rose Bowl on May 17.

Kiss
Sting
Bowling for Soup
Boomkat
Amanda Perez
Santana
Christina Aguilera
Ruben Studdard
Lisa Marie Presley
Sugar Ray
Paris Hilton
Nelly
Tyrese
Craig David
Michelle Branch
Jennifer Love Hewitt
O-Town
Daniel Bedingfield
JC Chasez (w/ Drumlines)

2004 lineup
The 2004 event was held at the Rose Bowl on May 15.

Ashlee Simpson
Backstreet Boys
Cassidy
Enrique Iglesias
Fefe Dobson
the Black Eyed Peas
Good Charlotte
Haylie Duff
Hilary Duff
J-Kwon
JC Chasez
Janet Jackson
Jessica Simpson
Kimberley Locke
Lenny Kravitz
Maroon 5
N*E*R*D
Nick Cannon
OutKast
William Hung
The Pussycat Dolls
Rooney

2005 lineup
The 2005 event was held at Angel Stadium of Anaheim on May 14.

Gwen Stefani
Will Smith
Jennifer Lopez
Kelly Clarkson
The Black Eyed Peas
Ludacris
Backstreet Boys
Ciara
Lindsay Lohan
Simple Plan
Paulo Arago
Natalie
Pussycat Dolls
Frankie J
Fat Joe

2006 lineup
The 2006 event was held at Verizon Wireless Amphitheatre on May 7.

Kanye West
Mary J. Blige
Daddy Yankee
Rihanna
Ne-Yo
Ray-J
Natasha Bedingfield
Nick Cannon
Baby Bash

2007 lineup
The 2007 event was held at Verizon Wireless Amphitheatre on May 12.

Omarion
Pitbull
Gym Class Heroes
Robin Thicke
Elliott Yamin
Baby Bash
Paula DeAnda
Fergie
Kelly Clarkson
Enrique Iglesias
Ludacris

2008 lineup
The 2008 event was held at Verizon Wireless Amphitheatre on May 10.

Pitbull
Snoop Dogg
Flo Rida
Danity Kane
Cherish
Miley Cyrus
Shwayze
The Dey
Jonas Brothers
Have Heart

The Dey did not perform, so Prima J took their place instead.

2009 lineup
The 2009 event was held at Verizon Wireless Amphitheatre on May 9.

The Black Eyed Peas
Kelly Clarkson
Flo Rida
Lady Gaga
All American Rejects
Soulja Boy
Kevin Rudolf
Pitbull
Madcon
Quest Crew
Jeremih
Kian
Special Performance by Jamie Foxx
FREQUENCY 5

2010 lineup
The 2010 event was held at Staples Center on May 15.

Main Stage
Usher
Ludacris
Taio Cruz
Akon
Justin Bieber
Lucero Perez
B.o.B
Bruno Mars
Rivers Cuomo
Adam Lambert
Iyaz
Ke$ha
David Guetta
Kelly Rowland

Village Stage
Auburn
Alexis Jordan
JLS
Wonder Girls
Justin Gaston
Charice
Breakout Star Winner Later Days

2011 lineup
The 2011 event was held at the Staples Center on May 14.

Main Stage
Cody Simpson
Cobra Starship
New Boyz
Selena Gomez & the Scene
Jason DeRulo
Far East Movement
Casey Abrams & Pia Toscano
Matthew Morrison
Lupe Fiasco
Ke$ha
T-Pain
Pitbull
Ne-Yo
Jennifer Lopez
Special Guest DJ Nick Cannon
Special Guest Host Britney Spears

Village Stage
Sabi
LaLa Romero
RPM
The Rej3ctz
The Ready Set
Breakout Star Winner:
Star, Chase Jordan
Cimorelli

2012 lineup
The 2012 event was held at the Home Depot Center on May 12.

Main Stage
Nicki Minaj
Pitbull
Maroon 5
Foster the People
B.o.B
Gym Class Heroes
J. Cole
Big Sean
Wiz Khalifa
Childish Gambino
K'naan
Chiddy Bang
The Wanted
Wallpaper
Diggy Simmons
 Big Time Rush
Carly Rae Jepsen
Hosted by Ryan Seacrest
Special Guest DJ Pauly D
Special Guest Host Justin Bieber

Village Stage
Colby O'Donis
7Lions
Megan & Liz
Zni
W3 The Future
Manika
Eva Universe
Elaine Faye

2013 lineup
The 2013 event was held at the Home Depot Center on May 11.

Main Stage
Avril Lavigne
Bruno Mars
Maroon 5
Flo Rida
will.i.am w/Shelby Spalione
Demi Lovato
Fall Out Boy
Afrojack
Miguel
Icona Pop
Krewella
Emeli Sandé
Ariana Grande
Hosted by Ryan Seacrest

Special Guest Host Britney Spears

Village Stage
Emblem3
Kalin & Myles
Will Jordan
Becky G
Vali
Asher Monroe
Alex Jacke

2014 lineup
The 2014 event was held at the StubHub Center on May 10.

Main Stage
Maroon 5
Shakira
OneRepublic
Ed Sheeran
Paramore
Ariana Grande with Iggy Azalea and Big Sean
The Chainsmokers
Rixton
Kid Ink
A Great Big World with Christina Aguilera
B.o.B
Calvin Harris
Zedd
R5
Tiësto
Hosted by Ryan Seacrest

Village Stage 

The Hotel Lobby
Rixton
G.R.L.
My Crazy Girlfriend
R5

2015 lineup
The 2015 event was held at the StubHub Center on May 9.

Main Stage
Fifth Harmony
Tori Kelly
Sia
Jason Derulo
Ne-Yo
Calvin Harris
Kanye West
Nick Jonas
Natalie La Rose
Meghan Trainor
David Guetta
LunchMoney Lewis
Justin Bieber
Echosmith
Hosted by Ryan Seacrest

Village Stage
Fifth Harmony
The Hotel Lobby
Eden xo
Jake Miller
Wild Style
Syd Youth
Alyxx Dione
Bean
R5
Los 5

2016 lineup
The 2016 event was held at the StubHub Center on May 14, 2016.

Main Stage
 Demi Lovato
 Zayn
 Ariana Grande
 Gwen Stefani
 Meghan Trainor
 Fifth Harmony
 Iggy Azalea
 Kygo
 DNCE
 Alessia Cara
 The Chainsmokers
 Mike Posner
 Hosted by Ryan Seacrest

2017 lineup
The 2017 event was held at the StubHub Center on May 13, 2017.

Main Stage
 Backstreet Boys
 Katy Perry
 Maroon 5
 Niall Horan
 Miley Cyrus
 Zedd with Alessia Cara
 Machine Gun Kelly with Camila Cabello
 Hailee Steinfeld
 Noah Cyrus
 Halsey
 Julia Michaels
 Luis Fonsi

Village Stage

Noah Cyrus
Jordan Fisher
Aaron Carter
Olivia Holt
Ocean Park Standoff
Hey Violet

2018 lineup
The 2018 event was held at the Banc of California Stadium on June 2, 2018. Additionally, this edition of the event was added to the national iHeartRadio concert schedule and advertised nationally.

Main Stage
 Ariana Grande
 Shawn Mendes
 Sabrina Carpenter
 Janelle Monáe
 5 Seconds of Summer
 NF
 Meghan Trainor
 Miguel
 Backstreet Boys
 Marshmello (with special guest appearance by Logic)

2019 lineup
The 2019 event was held at Dignity Health Sports Park on June 1, 2019.

Main stage
 Taylor Swift (with special guest appearance by Brendon Urie)
 Jonas Brothers
 Zedd
 Halsey (with special guest appearance by Yungblud)
 Ally Brooke (with special guest appearance by Tyga)
 Ava Max
 Fletcher
 Tomorrow X Together
 5 Seconds of Summer

Village Stage
 CNCO
 Jake Miller
 Scotty Sire
 Asher Angel
 Madison Beer
 Ally Brooke

2020 lineup 
The 2020 event was scheduled to take place at the Dignity Health Sports Park in Carson, California on June 6, 2020, but on March 24, it was cancelled in response to the COVID-19 pandemic as well as a gatherings ban issued by California Governor Gavin Newsom nearly two weeks earlier.

Main stage 

 Harry Styles

References

External links
 Kiis- Official Website
 Wango Tango- Official Website
 2003 Wango Tango Recap Video

Music festivals in Los Angeles
Recurring events established in 1997
1997 establishments in California